Hallstadt (b Bamberg) station, is a railway station in the town of Hallstadt, in Bavaria, Germany. It is located on the  Bamberg–Hof line of Deutsche Bahn.

Services
These are supplemented by longer-distance Regional-Express (RE) trains throughout the day.

References

External links
 
 

Railway stations in Bavaria
Buildings and structures in Bamberg (district)